Jean-Claude Pertuzé (11 September 1949 – 26 April 2020) was a French comic book artist, illustrator, and writer.

Publications

Comics in the Press
L’Ort vert, Haga (1974)
Métal hurlant (1978, 1979, 1980)
Les histoires de Papi Repapiol (1978–1980)
La Dépêche du Midi (1984)
Circus (1985)
Aventures de M. de Bistodénas (1986)
Tournesol
Les Clés de l’actualité

Comic Books
Contes de Gascogne (1977)
Les Chants de Pyrène (1981–1984)
Galipettes (1985)
Culbutes (1987)
Le Jour du Vignemale (1987)
Brassens, 1957-1962 : l'Amandier (1990)
L'Apôtre Zéro (1993)
Capotages (1994)
La fille du Capitoul (2004)
Mirguette et Toustounet (2005)
Vignemale, l’autre jour (2011)
Black Mountain, Le Louglier (2013)
Voyage au centre des Pyrénées (2014)

Illustrative Works
E nos fotèm d'èstre mortals
Petite histoire de Toulouse
Sorcières et sabbats de Gascogne
Les Carnets de Bernadou
Chroniques démoniaques et drolatiques (1987)
La Révolution à Toulouse (1989)
Petite Chronique de la Boue (1990)
Panthéon Pyrénéen (1990)
Robinson Crusoé dans les Pyrénées (1995)
Gascogne céleste (1999)
Gloires de Gascogne (2000)
les Nouvelles (2000)
A Bisto de Nas (2002)
Hilh de Pute Macarel (2003)
Caram ! Aixo me mira (2004)
Amour courtois et Libertinage (2004)
La Bise et l'Autan (2005)
L'Herbier érotique (2005)
Contes, légendes et récits de la vallée d'Aure (2006)
Gascons à table (2007)
Sur les pas de Bladé (2008)
Contes populaires de la Gascogne (2008)
Mon sabot de verre (2008)
Contes, légendes et récits du Louron et des Bareilles (2009)
L'Anniversaire (2012)
Contes populaires du Languedoc (2012)
Traité du Fouet, ou Aphrodisiaque externe (2013)
Le Dernier Voyage (2015)
Le Guide des prénoms occitans (2015)
Destins croisés (1914-1918) (2016)

Youth Publications
Le conte de Jean de l'Ours (1988)
Rampono (1993)
Les Petites Mains
Gros-Louis
Bos de Bénac
Dame Carcas
Trencavel
Pierrot et le secret des cailloux à feu (1999)
Malika la petite indienne (1999)
Julot sur le Canal du Midi (2001)
Activités Nature pour les 5-8 ans (2003)
Le Voleur de Temps
Mirguette et Toustounet (2005)
Petites Créations et récréations (2007)
Lire un conte à la carte (2012, 2013)

Exhibitions
En passant par la Gascogne (1979)
Le Robinson des Pyrénées (1995)
Les Ormes (2000)
BD Comminges (2011)
Le monde de Pertuzé (2014)

Awards
Prix Prosper-Estieu (2006)

References

External links
 Lambiek Comiclopedia article.

French comics artists
French illustrators
1949 births
2020 deaths